Nyayam Kaavali is a 1981 Indian Telugu-language film directed by A. Kodandarami Reddy. The film is based on D. Rameswari's novel Kotta Malupu. It stars Chiranjeevi, Raadhika, Jaggayya, and Sarada. The film was remade in Hindi as Mujhe Insaaf Chahiye in 1983, in Kannada as Keralida Hennu in 1984, in Tamil as Vidhi in 1984 and in Malayalam as Thaalam Thettiya Tharattu (1983).

Plot

Bharathi Devi was followed, loved, and subsequently cheated by Suresh. They even have sexual encounters, resulting in Raadhika becoming pregnant. When this is informed to her parents, they refuse to accept and want her to get an abortion. She refuses and approaches Lawyer Sakunthala. Her lawyer files a case in court. Defense lawyer Dayanidhi happens to be the father of Suresh. In spite of his skills, the truth prevails and Bharathi wins.

Cast

Production
Kranthi Kumar, who made Pranam Khareedu with Chiranjeevi, wanted to produce a small-budget film with him after the blockbuster Sardar Papa Rayudu. Doraiswamy Raju recommended the name of A. Kodandarami Reddy to Kranthikumar. After being unsatisfied with the scripts, Kranthi decided to adapt the novel Kotta Malupu into a feature film. The team decided to keep the film's title as Nyayam Kavali after considering titles like Aadapilla and Anyayam. The film was made on a budget of 5 lakh. Chiranjeevi was paid 15,000 and A. Kodandarami Reddy was paid 5,000. The film is Raadhika's Telugu debut, and a scene where she slaps Chiranjeevi took 24 takes to perfect.

Soundtrack 
Music was composed by K. Chakravarthy.

Remakes
Nyayam Kavali was remade in Hindi as Mujhe Insaaf Chahiye in 1983, in Kannada as Keralida Hennu in 1984, in Tamil as Vidhi in 1984 and in Malayalam as Thaalam Thettiya Tharattu (1983).

References

External links

1981 films
Films directed by A. Kodandarami Reddy
Indian courtroom films
Films scored by K. Chakravarthy
Telugu films remade in other languages
Films based on Indian novels
1980s Telugu-language films
Indian pregnancy films